The Zamora Trophy is a football award, established by Spanish newspaper MARCA in 1958. The award goes to the goalkeeper who has the lowest "goals-to-games" ratio.

In the inaugural year of the award, the winning goalkeeper had to play at least 15 league matches in the current season. In 1964, the limit for matches a goalkeeper had to play was raised to 22. In 1983, it was raised to 28 matches, including the rule that the goalkeeper had to play at least 60 minutes in match for it to count.

In the last couple of years the list of goalkeepers who would have won the trophy prior to 1958 has been published. For these seasons, a limit of matches that the goalkeeper had to play has been applied. For the leagues with only 10 teams the limit of matches was 14, for those of 12 teams it was 17 and for those of 14 the limit was 20 matches. For those leagues of 16 teams it is 22 – as originally established for the trophy from 1964 to 1983.

Rules 
 For a goalkeeper to be eligible for the trophy he should play at least 28 games, considered calculable, during the league season. For a match to be considered calculable the goalkeeper should play, at least, 60 minutes of said match.
 The winner shall be the goalkeeper who has the lowest coefficient, worked out to the second decimal place (hundredths). This is calculated by dividing all goals conceded in the league (including those matches which aren't calculable i.e. those in which the goalkeeper has played less than 60 minutes) by the total number of calculable matches.
 The trophy can be won by more than one goalkeeper if they have the same coefficient. In which case each goalkeeper shall be awarded a trophy.
 Each week MARCA shall publish a provisional league table. Until one or more goalkeepers reach the 28 calculable matches the league table shall reward those goalkeepers who have played the most calculable matches, and within those, the one who has the lowest coefficient.

Primera División

Winners

Statistics

Wins by player

Wins by club

Wins by country

Segunda División

Winners

Statistics

Wins by player

Wins by club

Wins by country

See also
Don Balón Award
Pichichi Trophy
Zarra Trophy
Trofeo Alfredo Di Stéfano
Miguel Muñoz Trophy
Ballon d'or

Notes

References

La Liga trophies and awards
Spanish football trophies and awards